Carley's Mills Schoolhouse is a historic one-room school building located at Hastings in Oswego County, New York.  It is a modestly scaled, one story frame building built about 1870.  On the rooftop is a hipped roof belfry, which still retains what appears to be the original bell.  Also on the property is a cast iron water pump.  It ceased being used as a school in 1953.

It was listed on the National Register of Historic Places in 2005.

References

External links
Carley Mills School - history

School buildings on the National Register of Historic Places in New York (state)
School buildings completed in 1870
One-room schoolhouses in New York (state)
Schoolhouses in the United States
Buildings and structures in Oswego County, New York
National Register of Historic Places in Oswego County, New York